"Make Up Sex" is a song by American musician Machine Gun Kelly featuring fellow American musician Blackbear. The song released on April 26, 2022 as the fifth single from Kelly's sixth studio album Mainstream Sellout (2022). The song was written by the artists, Nick Long, and producers Travis Barker and Omer Fedi.

Reception
The Guardian said that the song has Mainstream Sellouts best, although lyrically uninspired, chorus. Wall of Sound called it his most mature song to date. i said to listen to the hilariously sexless song and try not to have a good time. Conversely, NME called it a far away from the humanizing, tender moments on Tickets to My Downfall. Pitchfork called it hollower than "My Ex's Best Friend".

Music video 
A music video was released a few days following the release of Mainstream Sellout, with the song being one of its most standout songs amongst the track-list. The video features Baker standing in a room surrounded by cats dancing and playing his guitar throughout numerous transitions of settings, blackbear's verse features himself dancing surrounded by a large number of bright silver balloons.

Charts

Weekly charts

Year-end charts

Certifications

Release history

References

2022 singles
2022 songs
Machine Gun Kelly (musician) songs
Blackbear (musician) songs
Bad Boy Records singles
Interscope Records singles
Songs written by Machine Gun Kelly (musician)
Songs written by Blackbear (musician)
Songs written by Travis Barker
Songs written by Omer Fedi
Song recordings produced by Travis Barker
Song recordings produced by Omer Fedi